Joyeuse (meaning "joyous, joyful") was, in medieval legend, the sword wielded by Charlemagne as his personal weapon. A sword identified as Joyeuse was used in French royal coronation ceremonies since the 13th century, and is now kept at the Louvre museum.

Description
 

In legend
Some legends claim Joyeuse was forged to contain the Lance of Longinus within its pommel. The blade may have been smithed from the same materials as Roland's Durendal and Ogier's Curtana.

A children's book from the early 20th century tells that "One priceless thing Charlemagne ever carried in his belt and that was Joyeuse, the Sword Jewellous, which contained in a hilt of gold and gems the head of the lance that pierced our Saviour's side. And thereto he wore a pilgrim's pouch — 'against my faring to Jerusalem, or, if that may not be, to remind me that our life is but a pilgrim's way, and our joy but a pilgrim's rest, and our hope a palm.'"

The 11th century Song of Roland describes the sword thus:

Some seven hundred years later, Bulfinch's Mythology described Charlemagne using Joyeuse to behead the Saracen commander Corsuble as well as to knight his comrade Ogier the Dane.

The town of Joyeuse, in Ardèche, is supposedly named after the sword: Joyeuse was allegedly lost in a battle and retrieved by one of the knights of Charlemagne; to thank him, Charlemagne granted him an appanage named Joyeuse.

Baligant, a general of the Saracens in The Song of Roland, named his sword Précieuse, in order not to seem inferior to Charlemagne.

Coronation sword of the French kings
A sword identified with Charlemagne's Joyeuse was carried in front of the Coronation processions for French kings, for the first time in 1270 (Philip III), and for the last time in 1824 (Charles X). The sword was kept in the Treasury of Saint-Denis since at least 1505, before it was moved to the Louvre in 1793.

This Joyeuse as preserved today is a composite of various parts added over the centuries of use as coronation sword. But at the core, it consists of a medieval blade of Oakeshott type XII, mostly dated from about the 10th century. Martin Conway argued the blade might date from the early 9th century, suggesting that it was indeed the sword of Charlemagne, while Guy Laking dated it to the early 13th century. Some authors have even argued that the medieval blade may have indeed been replaced by a modern replica in 1804 when the sword was prepared for the coronation of Napoleon Bonaparte.

The Louvre's official website dates the pommel from the 10th to 11th centuries, the crossguard to the 12th and the scabbard to the 13th century.

Gallery

References

 

Charlemagne
Medieval European swords
Objets d'art of the Louvre
Individual weapons
Medieval legends